In computing, a blind write occurs when a transaction writes a value without reading it. Any view serializable schedule that is not conflict serializable must contain a blind write.

In particular, a write wi(X) is said to be blind if it is not the last action of resource X and the following action on X is a write wj(X).

Transaction processing